By-elections to the Auckland City Council occur to fill vacant seats in the City Council. The death, resignation, bankruptcy or expulsion of a sitting Councillor can cause a by-election to occur.

Background
Local by-elections usually had a lower turnout compared to full local body elections. A notorious example occurred in August 1961 when a vacancy triggered the second by-election in under a year which had a turnout of only 3.65% of voters, prompting Mayor Dove-Myer Robinson to label the light turnout "...absolutely disgraceful. By failing to exercise their democratic right the public is just asking Parliament to take away from them the right to vote". By-elections on the city council were on occasion deferred if a substantial majority of the council agreed to fill the vacancy by appointment, resulting in the highest polling unsuccessful candidate at the previous election being appointed to the council unless there is a public demand for a poll to be held (known as extraordinary vacancies). This arrangement has happened several times such as in 1940 when Charles Bailey resigned his seat which was taken by Harry Butcher and March 1953 when Arthur Bailey died and his seat was taken by Bob Beechey.

Two future Mayors of Auckland (John Allum and Dove-Myer Robinson) entered the council via by-elections in 1920 and 1952 respectively.

List of by-elections

1903–86
Between 1903 and 1986 municipal elections in Auckland were conducted at large. The following is a list of by-elections held to fill vacancies on the Auckland City Council at large:

Key

1986–2010
Between 1986 and 2010 municipal elections in Auckland were held via a Wards system of local electoral districts. The following is a list of by-elections held to fill vacancies on the Auckland City Council under the ward system:

Key

Results

1908 by-election

1909 by-election

May 1910 by-election

September 1910 by-election

1920 by-election

1921 by-election

April 1922 by-election

October 1922 by-election

1928 by-election

1936 by-election

1938 by-election

1952 by-election

1954 by-election

1957 by-election

1958 by-election

February 1961 by-election

August 1961 by-election

1963 by-election

1979 by-election

1987 by-election, Avondale Ward

1988 by-election, Central Ward

1991 by-election, Maungakiekie Ward

1994 by-election, Hauraki Gulf Islands Ward

2000 by-election, Avondale/Roskill Ward

2008 by-election, Avondale/Roskill Ward

Notes

References
 
 
 

Politics of the Auckland Region
 *
New Zealand, Auckland City Council
By-elections to the Auckland Council